The Renault Kwid is a crossover city car produced by the French car manufacturer Renault, initially intended for the Indian market and launched in 2015. In 2017, an improved Brazilian version was introduced for Latin American markets. Its battery electric version, named Renault City K-ZE, was launched in 2019, being manufactured in China and exported to Europe since 2021 as Dacia Spring Electric and to Latin America since 2022 as Renault Kwid E-Tech.

History 
The Kwid was developed under the project code BBA. It is the first car to be based on the new CMF-A platform jointly developed by Renault and Nissan. It is slightly longer but narrower than Renault's smallest conventional vehicle, the Twingo with a high sitting position and a  ride height.

The car was designed by an engineers' team settled in India led by Gérard Detourbet, a senior engineer, former mathematician described as "an innovation a minute" who led the development team for the first-generation Dacia Logan.

The Kwid was unveiled at Chennai on 20 May 2015 by Renault's CEO Carlos Ghosn. Ghosn said the car would be "a game changer for Renault in India." The car has 98 per cent of parts localisation and extensive engineering by local Renault's personnel. The Kwid is aimed at competing with other small cars within the Indian market, as the Suzuki Alto, and incorporates uncommon equipment for its segment such as a digital instrument cluster and a multimedia touchscreen.

In September 2015, the Kwid was launched in India at a starting price of 257,000 rupees, equal to $3,884.  Sales started in September and had a "flying start" of 25,000 bookings in 2 weeks and 50,000 in 5 weeks, then 70,000 in 2 months, getting 10% of effective market shares in its segment. The Indian version is exported to various overseas markets such as Sri Lanka, Indonesia, Tunisia and Sub-Saharan Africa.

Specifications
At launch, the only engine available was a three-cylinder, 799 cc unit with a  power output and  torque, coupled to a 5-speed manual transmission. In August 2016, the Kwid received a more powerful 1.0-liter engine.

The Renault Kwid received a minor update in July 2018. It gets new features such as pretensioner front seat-belts, two additional USB sockets, a rear armrest, a new grille and two new colour schemes. The Dacia Easy-R 5-speed automated manual transmission became available on Indian market Kwid models.

Latin American version 
In 2017, a heavily revised version of the Kwid started production at the Renault' plant in Brazil. To comply with stricter Brazilian regulations, the localised version has various structural reinforcements and four airbags as standard which made its weight go up 88 kg compared to the Indian version. This version only offers a 1.0-litre inline-three petrol engine.

It was also introduced to the Mexican market in May 2019, in the Intens, Iconic and Outsider trim levels. A Bitono trim level was added later on 10 November 2020, with the main difference having a black roof and can be ordered in the Marfil (Ivory), Rojo Fuego (Fire Red), and Naranja Ocre (Ocher Orange) colours. It is identical to the Outsider trim level and is positioned above said trim.

Facelift (2019)
The Kwid in its facelift form debuted in India in October 2019, with a front fascia inspired by their electric version Renault City K-ZE, unveiled earlier in 2018, with the featured split headlamps consisting of LED daytime running lights, turning lights and positioning lights in the top portion and the main beam in the bottom portion. The Kwid facelift also featured a larger 8.0 inch infotainment system equipped with Apple CarPlay and Android Auto and an optional passenger side front airbag.

This facelift was launched for the Brazilian and Latin American markets in early 2022.

The Kwid in facelift model was went on sale in Brunei in late July 2022, marking the return of the Renault brand in the Brunei market after 9 years. It is offered in RXT and Climber variants.

Safety 
The Kwid is equipped with rear drum brakes.

At tests conducted in 2016, the Indian version of the Kwid with no ABS scored a 0-star rating for adult occupants and 2 stars for infants from Global NCAP, a rating also achieved by many entry-level competitors in the Indian market, including localised versions of the Suzuki Alto, the Hyundai Eon, the Tata Nano, the Suzuki Celerio and the Ford Figo. The Kwid was also criticised for being one of the Indian models not having airbags as standard. Renault and other car manufacturers made objections to Global NCAP for its methodology and for ignoring India's own safety criteria, complaints also made in other regions as the NCAPs try to raise the safety level beyond that prescribed by the local regulators, which corresponds to 0-stars. One version with driver airbag obtained 1 star for adult occupants but also 1 star for infants the same year. A two-airbag version for Africa was tested in 2020 and obtained 2 stars for both (similar to Latin NCAP 2013).

The Brazilian-built Kwid in its most basic Latin American configuration with 4 airbags and no ESC got a 3-star rating from Latin NCAP in 2017, which corresponds to a now obsolete but already one level more strict protocol than the one used by Global NCAP before H2 2022.

Engines
{| class="wikitable" style="font-size: 90%; text-align: center;"
|-
! Motor || Type || Displacement || Power || Torque || Top speed || Transmission || 0–100 km/h || Fuel consumption
|-
! colspan="9" | Petrol
|-
| 0.8 SCe
| rowspan="2" | I3
| 799 cm³
| 
| 72 N⋅m at 4400 rpm
| 143 km/h
| rowspan="2" | 5-speed manual
| 16,4 s
| 4,1 L
|-
| 1.0 SCe
| 999 cm³
| 
| 91 N⋅m at 4250 rpm
| 152 km/h
| 13,9 s
| 4,7 L
|}

 Sales 

  Renault City K-ZE 

The Renault City K-ZE is a battery electric version of Renault Kwid, manufactured since 2019 in a facility in Shiyan, Hubei owned by eGT New Energy Automotive, a joint venture between Dongfeng, Renault and Nissan. A concept car was shown initially at the 2018 Paris Motor Show, and the final production model debuted in April 2019 at Shanghai Motor Show, going on sale later in September. Using a dedicated variant of the CMF-A platform, named CMFA-EV, the K-ZE is Renault's smallest electric vehicle, sitting beneath the Renault Zoe. It is notable for its low price, starting at less than $8,700 after incentives.

The model also introduced first hand the facelift for the ICE-powered Renault Kwid, launched in India in October 2019. In the front, the City K-ZE featured split headlamps consisting of LED daytime running lights, turning lights and positioning lights in the top portion and the main beam in the bottom portion. It also received tail lights with C-shaped LED light guides. Each wheel is fixed by 4 nuts instead of 3 like on the ICE versions. The electric models are not produced in a right-hand drive configuration.

Specifications

DC fast charging from 0% to 80% takes 50 minutes.

Optional equipment includes an infotainment system with a  touchscreen, a backup camera and manual air conditioning. A smartphone app allows remote monitoring of the vehicle's status.

 Pricing and reception 

With the price starting at RMB  after incentives, which puts it at RMB  without them, this electric car is very cheap by Western standards.

The car represents a category of budget electric city cars popular in China, but practically nonexistent in the West; among these, it is probably the first one carrying a badge of a Western marque. Prices of electric vehicles in general are much lower in China than in the US or Europe, and they exhibit a downward trend while in the West they show an upward trend: a report by JATO Dynamics shows that an all-electric car priced at $1 in 2011 would now cost $0.52 in China, but $1.42 in Europe and $1.55 in the US.

The car was launched in China on 10 September 2019.

The International Business Times wrote that it looks set to become the real "Tesla Killer" simply because of its low price, while erroneously stating it's the cheapest EV in the world (there are even cheaper EVs in China).

 Dongfeng brands-badged models 
Alongside the production version of the City K-ZE, Dongfeng Nissan showed off their version of an electric Kwid under the Venucia brand in the form of the Venucia e30. The e30 is essentially a badge engineered City K-ZE, sharing the same basic powertrain and design. The e30 name was previously used on another badged engineered EV based on the first generation Nissan Leaf.

Dongfeng-Fengshen also unveiled the Aeolus EX1 during the 2019 Chengdu Auto Show. The pre-sale price range of the EX1 after subsidies is 70,000 to 80,000 yuan (~US$9813 to US$11,215). The EX1 is powered by an electric motor with a maximum power output of 33 kW (44 hp). As of December 2020, the Aeolus EX1 was relaunched as the Dongfeng EV EX1 sold under the Dongfeng EV brand. 

In July 2022, a restyled version was introduced as the Dongfeng Nano Box sold under the Dongfeng EV brand and positioned above the Dongfeng EV EX1. In opposite of Venucia and Aeolus modelsboth of them with their front end inspired on the first ICE-powered Renault Kwid designthis one is more based on the City K-ZE fascia itself, but with more original design tweaks, thanks to plastic-molded components, much cheaper to modify than steel parts. Despite running the same engine as the other models, Dongfeng promises the Nano Box can run 331 km (206 mi) in the Chinese test cycle.

 Dacia Spring Electric 
In October 2019, Gilles Normand, head of the EV department in Renault, indicated that a version of City K-ZE to be exported to the European market was in the works, under the internal code BBG. On 3 March 2020, the Romanian car manufacturer DaciaRenault's budget-car subsidiary in Europeunveiled a concept car of K-ZE for that market, under the name of Dacia Spring Electric. It was intended to be presented at the 2020 Geneva Motor Show. However, once the entire show was cancelled due to COVID-19 pandemic, it was presented via web live stream. The concept had a grey body colour enhanced with neon orange accents on the rims, the door handles, the mirrors and the grille.

The production model of Spring Electric was presented at Renault EWAYS conference on 15 October 2020. To meet European safety standards, Spring Electric has been reengineered, featuring a reinforced chassis, six airbags and other assistance systems.

Their sales began in March 2021. At its introduction, it was the cheapest electric car in Europe. The Spring Electric was also the second most popular model of electric car exported from China in the first eight months of 2021only behind Tesla Model 3with a total of 17,398 units sold in that period. Car-sharing services and cargo utility versions were also launched later in 2021. The deliveries for companies started in early 2021, while for private customers in autumn of 2021.

The 2023 Spring Electric, launched in June 2022 alongside all the other Dacia models, had a slight facelift on the front grille and a new badge on the rear, featuring the new Dacia logo and branding. The least expensive version for consumers now starts at € in France, € after subsidies.

It has a  motor and weighs 970 kg, allowing it to carry four people.

 Safety 
The Dacia Spring in its standard European configuration was awarded a one star rating in the Euro NCAP crash test published in December 2021. Euro NCAP said the testing highlighted "a high risk of life-threatening injuries for driver chest and rear passenger head in frontal crash tests and marginal chest protection in side impact." The protocol still in use by Latin NCAP in 2022 (one level above that of 2017) is very similar to the 2014 Euro NCAP (four levels below that of 2021).

 Renault Kwid E-Tech 
The City K-ZE also began to be exported to Brazil in 2022 as a Renault Kwid top-range version, named the Renault Kwid E-Tech Electric''', matching the current Renault branding for electric vehicles.

It weighs 977 kg instead of the 818 kg of the standard Brazilian ICE version, so it can carry 4 people instead of 5 in the latter.

In 2023, the Kwid E-Tech Electric starts to be exported to most Latin America countries.

Kwid concept 

The Renault Kwid concept was unveiled at the 2014 Auto Expo in India. The SUV-like concept incorporates a roof-mounted, remote-controlled quadcopter (called the "Flyer Companion"), butterfly doors and has large R16 wheels. According to Renault, the interior was "inspired by a nest" and has a 3-seat front and 2-seat rear arrangement.

References

External links 

 

Kwid
Spring
Cars introduced in 2015
2010s cars
Crossover sport utility vehicles
City cars
Hatchbacks
Front-wheel-drive vehicles
Renault City K-ZE
Dacia Spring Electric
Euro NCAP superminis
Global NCAP superminis
Latin NCAP superminis
Cars of Brazil